Bremer Klaben, or just Klaben, is a type of Stollen from Bremen, Germany. This celebrated bread, famous in Northern Germany, is traditionally eaten during the Christmas season. It is said that Bremer Klaben tastes especially good when it is baked two weeks before serving. It has a shelf life of several months.

Appearance
This pastry has more raisins than an ordinary fruit cake. It is a bread of sorts made with dried fruit (especially raisins), flour, butter, sugar, orange and lemon peel, rum, almonds, yeast and salt, though many variations exist. A feature that distinguishes it from Stollen is that it is not dusted with powdered sugar after baking. The recipe is closely associated to the traditional Stecker cake shop which was founded in 1742.

History
The earliest known document mentioning Klaben is from 1593.

Since December 2009 it has a protected designation of origin. The bread- shaped cake joined the select ranks of food that enjoy protected geographical indications under EU law, such as Aachener Printen gingerbread and lebkuchen from Nuremberg. The Commission Regulation of the European Union released the announcement through its Official Journal.

References

Yeast breads
Sweet breads
German cuisine
German desserts
Christmas food
Christmas in Germany
Almond desserts
Foods with alcoholic drinks